Philip the Elder may refer to:

Philip I, Count of Hanau-Lichtenberg
Philip I, Count of Katzenelnbogen

See also
Philip Elder